Johnston Lykins (April 15, 1800 – August 15, 1876) was a prominent settler and civic leader in the American frontier Town of Kansas, which became Kansas City, Missouri. He worked with the first printing press in Kansas, and founded the area's first bank, newspaper, and Baptist church. He was the Town of Kansas's first president of city council, and first duly elected mayor. He is reportedly "possibly associated with more Kansas City 'firsts' than any other early settler".

History

Early life
Lykins was born in Franklin County, Virginia.

Missionary career
He became involved with the work of Isaac McCoy, among the area's American Indian tribes. He joined the McCoy mission to the Wea peoples in northern Indiana in 1819. Lykins was not yet a Christian, and was hired only as a schoolteacher. He spent more time traveling for supplies and assisting the mission's functions than he did teaching school. He quit several times over the first several years, but kept returning.

In 1820, McCoy moved his mission to Fort Wayne, Indiana, and in 1822 moved again to Michigan Territory, founding the Carey Mission among the Potawatomi people. Lykins was baptized in 1822 and was soon appointed as a missionary by the Baptist Board of Missions for the United States.

Lykins applied himself diligently to his calling, and by 1824 could read religious discourses in the Potawatomi language. He continued in Michigan until 1831, and in 1828 he married Delilah McCoy, Isaac's daughter.

The Indian Removal Act of 1831, which Lykins and McCoy had been essentially advocates of, resulted in many of the mission's constituents moving westward. In 1831, Lykins went with them, founding a mission in Missouri near the Shawnee reservation. This first move was a prelude to the later 1838 removals, known as the Potawatomi Trail of Death.

The Baptist mission board approved funds for printing religious tracts in native tribal languages, so in 1833, Jotham Meeker brought the first printing press to the Shawnee Mission. Books in Shawnee, Potawatomi, and other native languages were rapidly produced, to be used in missionary educational programs such as literacy. Lykins was actively involved and edited the Sinwiowe Kesibwi (Shawnee Sun), a small newspaper published entirely in the Shawnee language.

In 1843 Lykins founded a mission among the Potawatomi near Topeka, Kansas. The restored mission, which was improved and expanded in later years, presently is used as a museum. Also in 1843, some of the tribal elders requested that he be named their tribal physician, a government post that provided him with a salary that was necessary to support the mission. His appointment was opposed by the Jesuits and the Potawatomi allied with them, but was granted in 1844. However, in that area quarrels abounded between clergy of the different Christian religions and even clerics of the same faith. Lykins was an enthusiastic participant in these, and made many enemies. This, compounded by their criticism of his lack of medical credentials, led to his dismissal from the government post of Physician to the Potawatomi in 1851.

In 1848 he began a trade school at the mission, and after three years he had 90 students.

He left the Potawatomi mission soon after losing his medical position, returning to the Shawnee mission until 1855, when it was closed. At that time he moved to Kansas City, to be near his son.

Kansas City life

A Kansas City Public Library historian said Lykins is "possibly associated with more Kansas City 'firsts' than any other early settler". Before it was called Kansas City, he came to what was then the Town of Kansas, becoming a wealthy civic booster and founding the area's first bank, newspaper, and Baptist church.

In 1831, Lykins purchased  in what would become the initial plat for Kansas City, as his property extended south from the Missouri River to Fifth and Broadway. He later expanded his holdings to 12th and Washington on Quality Hill. In 1856, he constructed the city's first mansion, reportedly the "handsomest residence west of St. Louis". While most citizens saw wooden sidewalks and muddy streets roamed by livestock, this classic revival, or neoclassical, style two-story brick mansion had 14 rooms, 10 fireplaces, circular staircases, and crystal chandeliers. It often served as a gathering space for community representatives to discuss civil and political issues. After his death, his widow Martha married artist George Caleb Bingham, and they lived there. It became an early home of the Barstow School for Girls. It was renovated into a hotel named Washington Hotel, Mondamin Hotel, and then Roslin Hotel. The Kansas City Star lamented its demolition in late 1990 as an icon of the cultural failure of the developers, the city government, and the public, to preserve historical architecture.

While residing in Kansas City, Lykins functioned as a medical doctor, apparently self-taught. He had no formal training, but medical training was often casual in those days. Faced by the desperate need of his Native American students and their families, who were succumbing to various diseases, he read and did what he could. He already had achieved a reputation as an effective physician when he first went to Missouri. There he was confronted by a smallpox epidemic on the Shawnee reservation and began a vaccination program, an unusual approach by then. He was the first president of Mechanics Bank.

He married again in 1851.  His second wife was Martha A. Livingston, who wrote a manuscript titled "Recollections of Early Times in Kansas City" which is now in the collection of the Jackson County Historical Society.

In 1853, Kansas City was incorporated and elected its first mayor, William Samuel Gregory.  He served only 10 months when it was discovered that he was not eligible to be mayor because he did not live within the city limits. Lykins, who was the first president of the city council, became mayor. He completed the final two months of Gregory's term and was elected to another one-year term.

During the American Civil War he maintained loyal Union ties while his new wife had to move to Clay County, Missouri as a result of General Order No. 11 which required loyalty oaths for those living near the Kansas border south of the Missouri River.

Lykins continued to reside in Kansas City until his death in 1876. He is buried in Union Cemetery in Kansas City.

Legacy
His namesake Lykins Neighborhood is in Historic Northeast Kansas City, east of his former mansion. It is characterized by an internationally diverse population including immigrants and refugees. Its neighborhood association is a model for Kansas City neighborhoods, for rehabilitation of historic blight caused by racist housing policies set by JC Nichols in the early to mid 1950s. The site of the now demolished Lykins School is at the forefront of Lykins Square.

References

1800 births
1876 deaths
People from Franklin County, Virginia
Mayors of Kansas City, Missouri
Burials at Union Cemetery, Kansas City, Missouri
American Protestant missionaries
19th-century American politicians
Protestant missionaries in the United States